The 1968 winners of the Torneo di Viareggio (in English, the Viareggio Tournament, officially the Viareggio Cup World Football Tournament Coppa Carnevale), the annual youth football tournament held in Viareggio, Tuscany, are listed below.

Format
The 16 teams are organized in knockout rounds. The round of 16 are played in two-legs, while the rest of the rounds are single tie.

Participating teams

Italian teams

  Bologna
  Fiorentina
  Inter Milan
  Juventus
  Milan
  Napoli
  Roma
  Sampdoria

European teams

  Eintracht Frankfurt
  Dukla Praha
  Partizan Beograd
  Vojvodina
  Steaua București
  Benfica
  Burevestnik
  Stade de Reims

Tournament fixtures

Champions

Footnotes

External links
 Official Site (Italian)
 Results on RSSSF.com

1968
1967–68 in Italian football
1967–68 in Yugoslav football
1967–68 in Spanish football
1967–68 in German football
1967–68 in Czechoslovak football
1967–68 in French football
1967–68 in Portuguese football
1967–68 in Romanian football
1968 in Soviet football